Joan II may refer to:

 Joan II, Countess of Burgundy (1292–1330), Queen of France by marriage to Philip V
 Joan II, Countess of Dreux (1309 – 1355), only child of John II of Dreux
 Joan II of Navarre (1312–1349), Queen of Navarre
 Joan II, Countess of Auvergne (1378 – c. 1424), Sovereign Countess of Auvergne and Boulogne
 Joan II of Naples (1373–1435), Queen of Naples

See also
 Joan Ramon II, Count of Cardona (1400–1471), Catalan nobleman